In the United Kingdom there are various standardized tests for admission to university. Most applicants to universities in the UK take national examinations such as A-levels or Scottish Highers. Separate admissions tests are used by a small number of universities for specific subjects (particularly law, mathematics and medicine, and courses at Oxford and Cambridge), many of these administered by Cambridge University's Admissions Testing Service.

English Literature Admissions Test

History Aptitude Test
The History Aptitude Test (HAT) is a standardized test used as part of the admissions process to Oxford University for undergraduates applying to read history, or a subject including history, for example English with history.

The one-hour test is currently only employed by Oxford University, though other universities are considering adopting a similar examination as part of admissions.

Modern and Medieval Languages Test
The Modern and Medieval Languages Test (MML) is a university admissions test used in the United Kingdom. It is currently used by the University of Cambridge.

National Admissions Test for Law

Sixth Term Examination Paper

Mathematics Admissions Test
The Mathematics Admissions Test (MAT) is a 2-hour 30-minute subject-specific admissions test for applicants to the University of Oxford, the University of Warwick and Imperial College London for undergraduate degree courses in mathematics, computer science and their joint degrees. It is set with the aim of being approachable by all students, including those without further mathematics A Level.

The MAT is held pre-interview stage at the beginning of November. Test results are not published automatically, but for the University of Oxford, candidates may request their test score as part of the usual University of Oxford feedback process.

Physics Aptitude Test
The Physics Aptitude Test (PAT) is a 2-hour subject-specific admissions test for applicants to the University of Oxford for undergraduate degree courses in engineering, materials science and physics undergraduate degree courses.

The PAT is held pre-interview stage at the beginning of November. Test results are not published automatically, but candidates may request their test score as part of the usual University of Oxford feedback process.

References

Entrance examinations
Standardized tests
University of Oxford examinations
University of Cambridge examinations